The Gilbert River is a freshwater tributary of the Cyriac River, flowing in the unorganized territory of Lac-Ministuk, in the Le Fjord-du-Saguenay Regional County Municipality, in the administrative region of Saguenay–Lac-Saint-Jean, in the province of Quebec, in Canada.

The Gilbert River is accessible by route 175; other secondary forest roads have been developed in the sector for the needs of forestry and recreational tourism activities .

Forestry is the primary economic activity in the sector; recreational tourism, second.

The surface of the Gilbert River is usually frozen from late November to early April, however safe circulation on the ice is generally from mid-December to late March.

Geography 
The main watersheds adjacent to the Gilbert River are:
 north side: Cyriac River, Lac des Îlets, Simoncouche Lake, Simoncouche River, Saguenay River;
 east side: Cyriac river, Savane brook, rivière du Moulin, Bras Sec;
 south side: Petite rivière Pikauba, Talbot Lake, Pikauba River, Ovide stream;
 west side: Petite rivière Pikauba, Minustuk lake, Cyriac lake, Pikauba River, Bras des Angers.

The Gilbert River has its source at Prud’homme Lake. The northern mouth of Lake Prud’homme is located at:
  southwest of route 175
  south-west of the course of the Cyriac River;
  north-east of the course of the Petite rivière Pikauba;
  south-east of the confluence of the Gilbert river and the Cyriac River.

  towards the west curving towards the north, then crossing a small lake, to its mouth;
  towards the north curving towards the northeast, up to a bend in the river;
  northerly, up to the highway 175 bridge;
  northerly, along the west side of route 175, to a stream (coming from the west);
  towards the northeast, along the west side of route 175, to its mouth.

The Gilbert River flows onto the west bank of the Cyriac River. This confluence is located at:
  east of the southern bay of Lac Cyriac;
  west of the course of the Moulin river;
  east of route 175;
  north-east of route 169;
  north-east of the locality Mont-Apica;
  south-east of the confluence of the Cyriac river and Kenogami Lake;
  south of the confluence of the Chicoutimi River and the Saguenay River.

Toponymy 
The toponym “Gilbert River” was formalized on December 5, 1968, at the Place Names Bank of the Commission de toponymie du Québec.

Notes and references

Appendices

Related articles 
 Le Fjord-du-Saguenay Regional County Municipality
 Lac-Ministuk, an unorganized territory
 Laurentides Wildlife Reserve
 Cyriac River
 Kenogami Lake
 Chicoutimi River
 Saguenay River
St. Lawrence River
 List of rivers of Quebec

Rivers of Saguenay–Lac-Saint-Jean
Le Fjord-du-Saguenay Regional County Municipality
Laurentides Wildlife Reserve